The 338th Army Band is a United States Army Reserve military band stationed in Whitehall, Ohio and Livonia, Michigan.  Currently the unit serves under the 88th Regional Support Command, headquartered at Fort McCoy, Wisconsin.

On 12 July 2018, while training at Fort Bliss, 338th Army Band was the military band of the change of command ceremony for the incoming and outgoing commanding generals of 1st Armored Division at Noel Parade Field.

History
The 338th Army Band was originally formed in 1943 at Camp Siebert, Alabama, as part of a support group for General Patton's 3rd Army in Europe. The band was deactivated before overseas deployment in 1945. The 338th was reactivated in 1952 as part of the Second United States Army. Later, the 338th became part of the XX Corps of the First United States Army. In 1967 the band was reassigned to the 83rd Army Reserve Command at Fort Hayes in Columbus, Ohio. In July 1995 the 338th moved its location to Whitehall, Ohio, near the Defense Supply Center, Columbus. In September 1995 the 338th was transferred to the 88th Reserve Support Command with headquarters at Fort Snelling, Minnesota. Subsequently, that command became the 88th Regional Support Command and then became the 88th Regional Readiness Command. In 2002 the former members of the 70th Division Band (Reserve), based in Livonia, Michigan, became the First Detachment of the 338th. In 2006 the 338th was reassigned to the 310th Expeditionary Support Command, Fort Benjamin Harrison, Indiana. In 2008, the 338th was reassigned as a Direct Reporting Unit (DRU) to the 88th Regional Support Command newly headquartered at Fort McCoy, Wisconsin.

70th Division Band history
The 70th Division U.S. Army Band was activated on May 15, 1943, at Camp Adair, Oregon, and served with the division in Italy, France, and Germany. During this period, the division saw combat in numerous battles, including the capture of Monte Cassino, Italy, and the Battle of the Bulge. The band itself earned campaign credit for service in the Rhineland and Central Europe. The band was inactivated in Germany in December 1945, but reactivated in Michigan during the Korean War. In 2002, the band was moved to Seattle, Washington and many of the members became attached to the 338th in Columbus, Ohio, with station in Livonia, Michigan. The newly based 70th Division Band in Washington became attached to the 204th Band and later decommissioned in 2009.

Ensembles
 Concert Band
 Ceremonial Band
 Jazz Octet
 Generations Show Band
 Thunderbolt Stage Band (Big Band)
 Brass Quintet
 Ska Band
 Saxophone Quartet
 Woodwind Quintet

Resources
338th Army Band Website

78th Army Band, Ft. Dix, NJ

References

338
Wind bands
Musical groups established in 1943